Newport Networks was a manufacturer of Voice over IP Session Border Controllers (SBCs), founded by entrepreneur Terry Matthews. 
Headquartered in Caldicot, near Newport in South Wales, with its R&D facility in High Wycombe, Buckinghamshire, the company's hardware products consisted of the chassis based 1460 and the smaller 4U 310. These two hardware platforms could run a number of different applications, these include Stand-alone or Integrated SBC, distributed SBC, Interconnect Border Controller Function (I-BCF) or Interconnect Border Gateway Function (I-BGF), the latter two being elements of IMS.

The company was founded in September 2000 and floated on the London Stock Exchange AIM (Alternate Investment Market), and alleged in 2008 to have recently started to achieve significant sales, in particular to Chunghwa Telecom, Taiwan's largest integrated telecommunications operator, which has deployed Newport Networks' 1460 session border controller in its VoIP network. Prior to that, the company's most notable customer was UK based Kingston Communications

In 2008 the company made the majority of its employees redundant, put the business up for any potential take over or sale and closed its High Wycombe research and development facility.

On 18 March 2009, Newport Networks, with its two remaining employees, de-listed from the AIM. This is despite having announced twelve months earlier that the company had signed a major OEM agreement which was expected to substantially increase its product sales.

The company has now ceased all trading, it has been placed into solvent liquidation and remaining funds distributed to shareholders.

Executives when company last traded
Sir Terence H. Matthews, Kt., OBE, P.Eng., F.I.E.E. FREng. - Chairman
John Everard - Director
John Ackroyd - Director/CEO/CFO/Company Secretary
Simon Gibson, OBE - Director
Sir David Rowe-Beddoe - Director

Origin of Newport name
Founder, Sir Terence H. Matthews has a history of naming companies after places in South Wales, from where he originates. Newport Networks is named after the city of Newport which is Matthews' birthplace. The company's headquarters is just outside Newport at Caldicot.

See also
Session Border Controller

Defunct companies of Wales